Tricholoma sulphurescens is a mushroom of the agaric genus Tricholoma. It was first formally described by Italian mycologist Giacomo Bresadola in 1905. It is found in Europe and northeastern North America.

See also
List of North American Tricholoma
List of Tricholoma species

References

sulphurescens
Fungi described in 1905
Fungi of Europe
Fungi of North America